The 2008 national road cycling championships begin in January in Australia and New Zealand. Most of the other national championships do not take place until June or July.

Jerseys
The winner of each national championship wears the national jersey in all their races for the next year in the respective discipline, apart from the World Championships. The jerseys tend to represent the countries' flag or use the colours from it.

2008 Champions

References 

National road cycling championships by year